Penicillium proteolyticum is an anamorph species of fungus in the genus Penicillium which produces wortmannin.

References

proteolyticum
Fungi described in 1961